Hockley was an intermediate station on the Great Western Railway's London Paddington to Birkenhead via Birmingham Snow Hill line, England, serving the Hockley area of Birmingham. It was around one mile from Snow Hill station. Opened in 1854, it lasted for the duration of the line's original life, eventually closing with the line in 1972.

The station had two bay and one island platform, with the only pedestrian access for passengers to the latter being from below.

Replacement

When the line was reopened in 1995, Hockley station was not reopened. On the other side of Icknield Street.

Little trace now remains of the original station, as the site was cleared in the 1990s when the line was reopened.

Image gallery

Hockley goods depot

Between 1854 and 1967, a large goods depot was situated alongside the station. It was the Great Western Railway's principal goods depot for the Birmingham area. The depot measured three-quarters of a mile long by two to three hundred yards wide. At the western end it had a transshipment interchange with barges on the Soho Loop of the Birmingham Canal. In the 1920s the depot employed over one thousand permanent staff.

References

Further reading

Former Great Western Railway stations
Disused railway stations in Birmingham, West Midlands
Railway stations in Great Britain opened in 1854
Railway stations in Great Britain closed in 1972